Shuanglong Town is a town in Changshou District, Chongqing, People's Republic of China.

Administrative division
The town is divided into 11 villages and 1 community, the following areas: Shuanglong Community, Longtan Village, Guhuang Village, Feishi Village, Changshouzhai Village, Lianhe Village, Luowei Village, Jianshan Village, Hongyan Village, Qunli Village, Lianfeng Village, and Tiantang Village (双龙社区、龙滩村、谷黄村、飞石村、长寿寨村、联合村、罗围村、尖山村、红岩村、群力村、连丰村、天堂村).

Divisions of Changshou District
Towns in Chongqing